Skye of Curr is a hamlet, situated  southwest of Grantown-on-Spey, in the Highlands of Scotland and is in the council area of Highland.

References

Populated places in Badenoch and Strathspey